WVEB-LD (channel 22), is a low-powered  television station serving Charlotte, North Carolina, United States that is licensed to Florence, South Carolina. The station is owned by INNOVATE Corp., as part of a duopoly with WHEH-LD (channel 41).

The signal originates from the Morris Communications Tower, located in Charlotte's Southside Park neighborhood.

History 
Originally licensed to Florence, South Carolina, in the Myrtle Beach media market, the station's construction permit was issued in late March 2012 under the translator-style callsign of W14EB-D. The current WVEB-LD callsign was adopted on June 28, 2016. Around that time, DTV America, its current owner relocated the station to be located in Charlotte, North Carolina to become a sister station to WHEH-LD, the Lumberton-licensed station that DTV America already owns. A recent RabbitEars.info query of WVEB revealed that the Morris Communications Tower was elected to be the station's transmitter site. The station identification card identifies it as a Charlotte-based station, even though officially, the city of license remains to be Florence. DTV America has a handful of other stations, on the air or silent, throughout the country that has a city of license outside of the market that it is located in.

Digital channels
The station's digital signal is multiplexed:

In November 2020, Cozi TV was replaced by Timeless TV; sometime between November–December 2020, The Country Network was replaced by infomercials.

References

External links

DTV America
Cozi TV

Cozi TV affiliates
Stadium (sports network) affiliates
Low-power television stations in the United States
Innovate Corp.
VEB-LD
Television channels and stations established in 2015
2015 establishments in South Carolina